07th Expansion is a Japanese dōjin circle specialized in the creation of visual novels and sound. They started out drawing for the trading card game Leaf Fight, but are known for creating the game series When They Cry. The remake games on additional consoles for Higurashi When They Cry were produced by Alchemist.

Members
Ryukishi07 – founder
Yatazakura – co-founder
BT – Homepage manager (died in 2009 from an illness)

Works

Visual novels

When They Cry
Higurashi
 Higurashi When They Cry
 Ch.1 Onikakushi: August 10, 2002 (Comiket 62)
 Ch.2 Watanagashi: December 29, 2002 (Comiket 63)
 Ch.3 Tatarigoroshi: August 15, 2003 (Comiket 64)
 Ch.4 Himatsubushi: August 13, 2004 (Comiket 66)
 Higurashi When They Cry Kai
 Ch.5 Meakashi: December 30, 2004 (Comiket 67)
 Ch.6 Tsumihoroboshi: August 14, 2005 (Comiket 68)
 Ch.7 Minagoroshi: December 30, 2005 (Comiket 69)
 Ch.8 Matsuribayashi: August 13, 2006 (Comiket 70)
 Higurashi When They Cry Rei (fan disc): December 31, 2006 (Comiket 71)
 Higurashi no Naku Koro ni Hō (fan disc): August 17, 2014 (Comiket 86)

Umineko
 Umineko When They Cry
 Episode 1: Legend of the Golden Witch: August 17, 2007 (Comiket 72)
 Episode 2: Turn of the Golden Witch: December 31, 2007 (Comiket 73)
 Episode 3: Banquet of the Golden Witch: August 16, 2008 (Comiket 74)
 Episode 4: Alliance of the Golden Witch: December 29, 2008 (Comiket 75)
 Umineko When They Cry Chiru
 Episode 5: End of the Golden Witch: August 15, 2009 (Comiket 76)
 Episode 6: Dawn of the Golden Witch: December 30, 2009 (Comiket 77)
 Episode 7: Requiem of the Golden Witch: August 14, 2010 (Comiket 78)
 Episode 8: Twilight of the Golden Witch: December 31, 2010 (Comiket 79)
 Umineko no Naku Koro ni Tsubasa (fan disc): December 31, 2010 (Comiket 79)
 Umineko no Naku Koro ni Hane (fan disc): December 31, 2011 (Comiket 81)
 Umineko no Naku Koro ni Saku (fan disc): October 4, 2019

Ciconia
 Ciconia When They Cry
 Phase 1: For You, the Replaceable Ones: October 4, 2019
 Phase 2 : Delayed

Others
 Higanbana no Saku Yoru ni
 Dai-ichi Ya: August 13, 2011 (Comiket 80)
 Dai-ni Ya: December 31, 2011 (Comiket 81)
 Rose Guns Days
 Season 1: August 11, 2012 (Comiket 82)
 Season 2: December 31, 2012 (Comiket 83)
 Season 3: August 10, 2013 (Comiket 84)
 Last Season: December 31, 2013 (Comiket 85)
 Trianthology: Sanmenkyō no Kuni no Alice: August 31, 2016 (Comiket 90)

Fighting games
 Umineko: Golden Fantasia: December 31, 2010 (Comiket 79)
 Ōgon Musōkyoku Cross: December 31, 2011 (Comiket 81)

Card games 
 Leaf Fight
 Tagai o Otoko no Ko Maid ni Chōkyōshiau Game: November 18, 2012

References

External links
 
 

Doujin soft developers
Video game companies of Japan
Video game development companies